Justicia spicigera (Mexican honeysuckle, firecracker bush, moyotle, moyotli, mohintli,  muicle, trompetilla, yaxan, or ych-kaan in Mayan) is an evergreen shrub with tubular orange flowers. The species is native to Belize, Costa Rica, El Salvador, Guatemala, Honduras, Mexico and Nicaragua.

Description 
Muicle shrubs grow perennially in full sun or partial shade, and typically reach heights of between 2–5 feet. Their leaves are around 2 inches long, and their bright orange flowers attract hummingbirds. They prefer warm weather, but can tolerate temperatures down to about -3 °C (26 °F). Muicle is known to have purple, pink, green, and orange colors when the leaves are boiled. Different pH values on muicle extracts modified the structure of the molecules and solubility, so depending on the pH of the plant, the color will vary.

Phytochemicals
The leaves and flowers contain various phytochemicals, including carbohydrates, pectins, flavonoids, tannins, essential oils, and minerals.

Uses 
Muicle can be made into a tea by boiling the leaves in water. As the leaves boil, they dye the water deep blue or indigo, explaining why the plant has also been traditionally used to make dye. Muicle has been used as a traditional medicine for the treatment of various ailments. Muicle is often used as a brightening agent in laundry.

References

External links

USDA Plants Database: Justicia spicigera Schltdl.

spicigera
Flora of Belize
Flora of Costa Rica
Flora of El Salvador
Flora of Guatemala
Flora of Honduras
Flora of Mexico
Flora of Nicaragua